Fort McIntosh is the name of several former military installations in the United States:

 Fort McIntosh (Georgia)
 Fort McIntosh (Pennsylvania)
 Fort McIntosh, Texas

See also
MacIntosh Forts, in Hong Kong